Alana Austin is an American retired film and television actress. She played the role of Abby Logan in the sitcom Ink and starred in the Disney Channel Original film Motocrossed.

Career
Austin was born in Palm Springs, California. She is the daughter of Steven Kent Austin a film producer who was the founder and chairman of the now-defunct Tag Entertainment. 

Austin made her major acting debut in the 1992 TV film Criminal Behavior starring Farrah Fawcett. Three subsequent 1993 TV films followed before co-starring in the 1994 theatrical film North. She then co-starred in the film A Simple Twist of Fate with Steve Martin for which was nominated for a Young Artist Award.

In 1996, Austin was cast in the CBS sitcom Ink opposite Ted Danson and Mary Steenburgen, the series was later canceled after its first season. She then went to guest star on Sister, Sister, In the House, That '80s Show, 7th Heaven, Boston Public, Cold Case and Close to Home. As well as appearing in the films Road Rage, Hansel and Gretel, A Mother's Instinct, Popstar (opposite Aaron Carter) and the Disney Channel Original film Motocrossed.

She was also scheduled to appear in a unproduced movie based on the Monster Jam tour which would have acted as a sequel to Motocrossed.

Filmography

Film

Television

References

External links

20th-century American actresses
21st-century American actresses
American child actresses
American film actresses
American television actresses
Living people
Actresses from Palm Springs, California
Year of birth missing (living people)